Spirorbula obtecta is a species of air-breathing land snail, a terrestrial pulmonate gastropod mollusk in the family Geomitridae, the hairy snails and their allies. 

This species is endemic to Porto Santo Island, Madeira, Portugal.

References

 Bank, R. A.; Neubert, E. (2017). Checklist of the land and freshwater Gastropoda of Europe. Last update: July 16th, 2017

External links
 Lowe, R. T. (1831). Primitiae faunae et florae Maderae et Portus Sancti; sive species quaedam novae vel hactenus minus rite cognitae animalium et plantarum in his insulis degentium breviter descriptae. Transactions of the Cambridge Philosophical Society. 4 (1): 1-70, pl. 1-6. Cambridge

Molluscs of Madeira
Endemic fauna of Madeira
Spirorbula
Gastropods described in 1831
Taxonomy articles created by Polbot